A-0 Geyser is a geyser in the Lower Geyser Basin of Yellowstone National Park in the United States.

A-0 Geyser is part of the White Creek Group which includes Spindle Geyser and Botryoidal Spring.

It erupts for a duration of about 30 to 40 seconds with intervals of 20 to 26 minutes between eruptions.

The name A-0 is an unofficial name based on the proximity of this geyser to the dormant A-1 and A-2 geysers.

The RCN location of this geyser has been unintentionally switched with Dilemma Geyser, elsewhere in the Lower Geyser Basin.

References 

Geysers of Wyoming
Geothermal features of Teton County, Wyoming
Geothermal features of Yellowstone National Park
Geysers of Teton County, Wyoming